Tămășeu is a commune located in Bihor County, Crișana, Romania. It is composed of four villages: Niuved (Nyüved), Parhida (Pelbárthida), Satu Nou (Kügypuszta) and Tămășeu.

Sights
 Reformed church, built in 1835
 Lythia spring
 Thermal bath

References

Communes in Bihor County
Localities in Crișana